The ZSSW-30 (Polish: Zdalnie Sterowany System Wieżowy 30 mm - 30mm Remote Control Turret System) is a Polish remotely controlled turret designed by Huta Stalowa Wola and WB Electronics as a replacement for the Hitfist-30P turret of the Rosomak APC. It will also be fitted on the Borsuk IFV.

Development history 
The ZSSW-30 turret was developed in response to the issues regarding the maintenance and modernization attempts of the Hitfist-30P turrets for the Rosomak APC. Initially the most popular direction was to buy a license for the Hitfist OWS unmanned turret with the rights to produce the majority of components domestically, however it was ultimately rejected as it was feared that the new turret would encounter identical issues, since they were caused mainly by poor cooperation between the Polish industry and Leonardo.

The design requirements were ready in March 2011, and two consortia entered the competition. First one consisting of ZM Bumar Łabędy, OBRUM, OBRSM (currently ZM Tarnów), Wojskowe Zakłady Motoryzacyjne (WZM), Przemysłowe Centrum Optyki (PCO), ZM Tarnów and WAT, and the second one of HSW and WB Electronics. Both contenders offered similar designs - closed turret structure protecting all the mechanisms and electronics with a separate container for ATGMs. The biggest difference between them was that the first design used the remote control weapon station (from the ZSMU-1276 family) as the commander's sight.

Ultimately, the second design was chosen despite the fact that the companies making up the first consortium had way more experience in designing turret systems (for example the turret of the PZA Loara). On March 29, 2013, an agreement was signed between the Polish MoD and the consortium consisting of Huta Stalowa Wola S.A. and WB Electronics, under which a prototype batch of five turrets was to be developed until 2015 and the serial production of the turrets for the Rosomak was to begin in 2016. The program was delayed several times due to the timeframe being unrealistically short and because the MoD, still remembering problems with the Hitfist-30P, decided to eliminate most of the foreign components from the design.

The first mock-up of the ZSSW-30 turret was presented at the MSPO 2014 military expo, with the first prototype being presented a year later when the initial developmental work was finished. Unlike the mock-up, the 2015 prototype already looked very similar to the final design with the main visual difference being the barrel shroud not present on the later prototypes and production variant.

Factory testing of the first turret prototype took place in 2015 and 2016, with the first ATGM test launches on July 14, 2016. The development has been completed in 2019 and the trials began on January 22, 2020. On October 1, 2021, the turret system had officially completed the trials with a positive result, which opened the way to negotiations between the MoD and the manufacturer and to serial production.

On July 5, 2022, the Armaments Agency (the procurement agency of the MoD) and the HSW-WB consortium signed a framework agreement for the delivery of 341 turrets for the Rosomak wheeled IFVs as well as an executive contract for the first 70 turrets. The first turrets are expected to be delivered in 2023. On November 21, 2022, WB Group contracted PCO with the production of 70 GOD-1 "Iris" and 70 GOC-1 "Nike" sights for the first batch of ZSSW-30 turrets.

Technical description

Armament 
The ZSSW-30 is armed with the Mk44S Bushmaster II chain gun, coaxial 7.62 mm UKM-2000C machine gun. and a launch container on its right side for two Spike-LR anti-tank guided missiles. It also features eight 81 mm grenade launchers using the GAk-81 phosphorus smoke grenades.

Main gun 

The main armament of the ZSSW-30 is the Mk44S Bushmaster II 30×173mm chain gun. Mk44S (Stretch) is a variant of the standard Mk44 gun that can be adapted to fire the 40×180mm SuperShot40 ammunition by swapping just a few components (including the barrel). The gun fires at a rate of 200 RPM for standard ammunition, and 120 RPM for ABM and has elevation angles extending from -9° to +60°. The gun has a dual feed system and is fed from the left side by two ammunition racks located on the left side of the turret - the smaller one, containing around 100 armor piercing rounds and the bigger one containing around 200 multi purpose rounds, which makes the turret's first stage ammunition rack one of the biggest among similar systems. The spent casings are ejected to the front, through the chute in the gun mantlet. The ammunition used in ZSSW-30 is produced by Mesko under a license from Nammo.

Coaxial machine gun 

Alongside the Bushmaster II chain gun, the ZSSW-30 is fitted with the UKM-2000C general-purpose machine gun. The machine gun is mounted coaxially to the main gun on its right side, with its barrel being covered by a shroud similar to that covering the coaxial machine gun of an Abrams tank. UKM-2000C is a version of the UKM-2000 (itself being a PKM designed to use 7.62×51mm NATO round linked by the M13 link), adapted to use in the vehicles by removing the stock and installing a solenoid trigger, gas regulator and heavier, longer barrel. It fires at a rate of 700-850 rounds per minute, and is fed by a 250-round belt. The spent casings and links are ejected through an opening in the right side of the turret below the ATGM container.

ATGM 

For engaging heavily armored targets, ZSSW-30 is equipped with two Spike-LR anti-tank guided missiles located in a launch container mounted to the right side of the turret. Spike-LR is an Israeli fifth generation anti-tank guided missile that features both fire-and-forget and command guidance operating modes. It also integrates third party target designation for indirect fire through its lock-on after launch capability for non-line-of-sight (NLOS) use. The missile has a tandem warhead with the penetration of over 700 mm RHA after ERA and can engage targets in a direct attack or top attack mode, which makes it capable of destroying modern MBTs. Spike-LR can hit targets at ranges from 200 meters to 4 kilometers when guided manually, and up to 4.5 kilometers in the fire-and-forget mode.

The missile offers three different operating modes:

 Fire-and-Forget
 Man In The Loop with optical fiber data-link
 Lock-on after launch (LOAL) for non-line-of-sight (NLOS) and using third party target designation.

The use of a separate ATGM launch container has some advantages compared to other systems where a launcher extends directly from an internal compartment of the turret. Among those are separation of the missiles from the rest of the turret (and thus greater safety of the crew and the turret itself) and ability to quickly replace damaged or destroyed container while in the field, while the main disadvantage of such design choice is a difficult integration of a hard kill active protection system. The ATGMs can be reloaded from a hatch in the rear of the vehicle without the necessity for the crew to leave the vehicle (in the same manner as it is being done in the Bradley IFV.

Smoke grenades 
For protection, the turret is equipped with eight 81 mm smoke grenade launchers, four on the left side and four on the front to the right of the main gun. The grenades used are the GAk-81 multispectral phosphorus grenades designed and produced by ZSP Niewiadów (Zakłady Sprzętu Precyzyjnego Niewiadów). When fired, grenades fly 30–60 meters (depending on the launcher's angle) and after up to 4.5 seconds from being fired, starts to produce the smokescreen. The smokescreen lasts for 30–50 seconds depending on the weather conditions and covers the vehicle in the visible light spectrum as well as in the IR spectrum of 1-5 µm.

ZSP Niewiadów designed a more modern GM-81 smoke grenade which works in a broader wavelength spectrum (0.3 - 14 µm) and has an additional charge which generates a short lasting (around 5 seconds) cloud of smoke immediately upon firing and covers the vehicle before the main charge starts generating smoke (which lasts longer as well - 40–60 seconds), however the Land Forces hasn't adopted it and still uses the old GAk-81 grenades.

Protection

Armor 
The level of armor protection of the ZSSW-30 turret is not disclosed by the manufacturer, but according to unofficial sources, the armor consists of a thin layer of polyethylene fabric sandwiched between two steel plates and an additional piece of ceramic composite armor (two steel plates with alumina tiles in between) on the ATGM container. This provides level III protection for both the main structure and the missile container, while the external parts such as the sights are protected at level II.

Active protection 
In addition to armor, ZSSW-30 is protected by the Obra-3 soft kill APS. This system consists of four laser detector sets (each one consisting of three detectors), a control unit and eight smoke grenade dischargers. The detectors work in 360° azimuth and in an elevation ranging from -6° to +30° and can detect light in the wavelength spectrum ranging from 0.6 to 11 µm as well as distinguish between different laser sources, such as laser rangefinders or target designators. Obra-3 can work in different modes: manual, semi-automatic and automatic. In the automatic mode the grenades are launched automatically into the specific path an incoming laser beam (immediately after the turret is rotated in this direction, which is also done automatically). The system uses GAk-81 phosphorus multispectral smoke grenades.

Situational awareness 
ZSSW-30 is equipped with the GOD-1 "Iris" sight for the commander and GOC-1 "Nike" sight for the gunner, both of which are integrated into the turret's fire control system and consist of a laser rangefinder as well as daytime and thermal optical channels. The turret is also fitted with an auxiliary optical sight which is not integrated with the FCS and is meant to be used in emergency situations from inside of the turret. It is located to the right of the gunners primary sight behind an armored cover.

Commander's sight 
The commander's sight provides 360° field of view with elevation angles from -20° to 60°. It is equipped with an eye-safe laser rangefinder and two optical channels: daytime, with a light intensity sensor and thermal. The sight can rotate with the angular velocity of 1 rad/s (57 °/s). The sight is mounted on top of the turret in an armored cover that provides level II of ballistic protection and can turn independently from the sight. This allows it to cover the sight by rotating 180°.

The daytime camera has two fields of view: wide (10.7° × 8°) and narrow (3.3° × 2.5°) which provide 5,500 m detection, 1,800 m recognition and 900 m identification ranges for the wide FoV and 12,500 m detection, 4,800 m recognition and 2,500 m identification ranges for the narrow one.

The night vision camera has a French 3rd generation (640 × 512 px) image sensor which works in the wavelength spectrum of 8 to 12 µm. It provides a wide FoV of 10° × 8° with 5,500 m detection, 1,800 m recognition and 900 m identification ranges and a narrow one of 3.1° × 2.5° with 13,500 m detection, 5,700 m recognition and 2,800 m identification ranges. The rangefinder uses the 1.54 µm laser and can measure the range from 100 to 10,000 meters, with a margin of error of 5 meters.

Gunner's sight 
The gunner's sight provides elevation angles from -10° to 60° and is equipped with an eye-safe laser rangefinder and two optical channels: daytime, with a light intensity sensor and thermal. The sight is mounted on the left side of the turret and can be covered by an armored door.

The daytime camera and laser rangefinder are identical to those used in the commanders sight.

The night vision camera has a French 3rd generation (640 × 512 px) image sensor which works in the wavelength spectrum of 3 to 5 µm. It provides a wide FoV of 10° × 8° with 4,950 m detection, 1,600 m recognition and 800 m identification ranges and a narrow one of 3.1° × 2.5° with 11,500 m detection, 4,800 m recognition and 2,400 m identification ranges.

Fire control system 
The ZSSW-30 fire control system is made by WB Group and provides full hunter-killer and killer-killer capabilities as well as superb accuracy when firing at moving targets from both moving and standing position. According to unofficial sources ZSSW-30 can engage moving targets at 2 kilometers range with greater accuracy than the Leopard 2A5. The fire control system also allows for shooting in every position of the turret relative to the hull in all three axis (which is not a common feature for other comparable systems). Both the gunner and the commander have an auto-tracker integrated into their FCS, which substantially increases automation of the entire firing process. The ZSSW-30 FCS is net-centric. It can transfer and coordinate information between different turrets. It is also able to coordinate and communicate with various types of UAVs. Both of those features greatly increase situational awareness and combat effectiveness of each and every vehicle.

See also 
Vehicles equipped with the ZSSW-30 turret:

 Rosomak
 Borsuk

Similar turret systems:

 Bumerang-BM
 Hitfist OWS
 TRT-25
 Shturm

References 

Military equipment of Poland
Remote weapon stations